Mirreyes contra Godínez 2: El retiro is a 2022 Mexican comedy film directed by Chava Cartas. The film stars Daniel Tovar, Regina Blandón, Alejandro de Marino, and Diana Bovio. It is the sequel to the 2019 film Mirreyes contra Godínez, and was released by Vix+ on 21 July 2022.

Cast 
 Regina Blandón as Michelle Kuri
 Daniel Tovar as Genaro González
 Alejandro de Marino as Shimon
 Diana Bovio as Nancy
 Christian Vázquez as Conan
 Roberto Aguire as Ricardo
 Gloria Stalina as Sofía
 Michelle Rodríguez as Goyita
 Tomás Rojas as Arquímedes
 Roberta Damián as Lua
 Carlos Ballarta as El Timido
 Dominika Paleta as Katia San Martín
 Claudia Ramírez as Emilia Kuri
 César Bono as Vicente
 Daniel García as Urrutia
 Mario Monroy as Police officer

Production 
On 31 October 2019, it was confirmed that a sequel to Mirreyes contra Godínez had been greenlit, and principal photography began in February 2020. Production of the film was put on hiatus after five days of filming as a safety precaution due to the COVID-19 pandemic. Filming concluded in early 2022.

Release 
The film was released on 21 July 2022 by Vix+.

References

External links 
 

Mexican comedy films
2022 comedy films
2020s Mexican films
Mexican sequel films
2020s Spanish-language films
Vix (streaming service) original films